Álvaro Guevara Reimers (13 July 1894 – 16 October 1951) was a Chilean-born painter, based in London and loosely associated with the Bloomsbury set.

Guevara left Chile in 1909 and arrived in London on 1 January 1910. He attended Bradford Technical College, studying the cloth trade, but also spent two years secretly studying at the Bradford College of Art. After failing his technical college exams he went on to the Slade from 1913 to 1916 and had a one-man show at the Omega Workshops.

He married Meraud Guinness (1904-1993), a painter and member of the Guinness family, and settled in France. He died in Aix-en-Provence on 16 October 1951.

References and sources
References

Sources
Tate Gallery
Latin Among Lions - Alvaro Guevara by Diana Holman-Hunt (1974, Michael Joseph)
Meraud Guinness Guevara, ma Mère by Alladine Guevara (2007, Rocher)

1894 births
1951 deaths
Guinness family
People from Valparaíso
Alumni of the University of Bradford
Alumni of University College London
20th-century Chilean painters
Chilean male artists
Chilean male painters
Male painters
20th-century Chilean male artists